Lingshet (or Lingshed) is the headquarter of Singelalok block in the Leh district of Ladakh, India. It is located in the Khalsi tehsil, about a day's trek from the nearest road. The village can be accessed via a road through Singela from Lamayuru.

The Lingshed Monastery, located nearby, is about 900 years old. In 2016, solar-powered direct-current microgrids were installed at the monastery, and in local school dormitories, along with a computer lab with a satellite Internet link.

Demographics 
According to the 2011 census of India, Lingshet has 116 households. The effective literacy rate (i.e. the literacy rate of population excluding children aged 6 and below) is 70.26%.

References 

Villages in Khalsi tehsil